Below is a list of the 10 tallest buildings in Winston-Salem above 200 feet. The tallest building in Winston-Salem, North Carolina is 100 North Main Street. The 2nd tallest building in Winston-Salem the tallest in Winston-Salem from 1966 to 1995 and the tallest building in North Carolina from 1966 to 1971 when Two Wells Fargo Center in Charlotte was constructed.

Tallest buildings

Timeline of tallest buildings

See also
 List of tallest buildings in North Carolina
 List of tallest buildings in Charlotte, North Carolina
 List of tallest buildings in Raleigh, North Carolina
 National Register of Historic Places listings in Forsyth County, North Carolina, which includes Nissen Building, 8 West Third Street, and perhaps more tall buildings of Winston-Salem.

References

 
Winston-Salem
Tallest in Winston-Salem